Tobias Jones may refer to:
Tobias Jones (writer), author of The Dark Heart of Italy
Tobias Jones, a character in the Driver video game franchise

See also
Toby Jones (disambiguation)